The 1990–91 Football League First Division season was the 92nd season of English top-flight football.

Overview

Arsenal took their second league title in three seasons despite a season during which it often looked as though the good points would be outnumbered by the bad points. A player brawl in a league fixture against Manchester United in October saw Arsenal have two points deducted, and a few weeks later captain Tony Adams was given a four-month prison sentence for drink-driving (he ended up serving 8 weeks). But Arsenal managed to keep up a great run of form throughout the season and were crowned league champions having lost just one league game all season long.

On 6 May 1991, Arsenal were crowned champions after beating Manchester United 3–1 while title challengers Liverpool who finished second, lost 2–1 to Nottingham Forest. Liverpool had led the table for much of the first half of the season but were shell-shocked in February by the sudden resignation of manager Kenny Dalglish. Rangers boss Graeme Souness was brought in as his successor but was unable to bring a major trophy to Anfield. Third place in the league went to Crystal Palace, who occupied their highest-ever finish, but were denied qualification for the UEFA Cup due to Liverpool being readmitted to European competition a year earlier than anticipated.

Newly promoted Leeds United had a good season back in the First Division as they finished fourth but never really looked like challenging for the title. They did, however, reach the semi-finals of the League Cup, where they lost to Manchester United. Howard Kendall returned to Everton for a second spell as manager in November, while his successor at Manchester City, Peter Reid got off to a fine start in management by guiding the Maine Road side to fifth place in the league - their highest final position for more than a decade. Wimbledon continued to defy the odds and finish above sides with greater resources with a seventh-place position in the final table.

Manchester United's league performances were too erratic for them to mount a title challenge, but they improved seven places on the previous season's final position to finish sixth, and marked a winning return to European competitions for English teams by lifting the European Cup Winners' Cup.

Tottenham Hotspur started the season well, not losing in the league until November, but a dismal second half of the season saw them finish 10th, although they did win the FA Cup for a record eighth time.

Down at the bottom end of the table, Derby County finished bottom with just five wins all season despite the 17 league goals of Welsh striker Dean Saunders, who was then sold to Liverpool. Their relegation was confirmed on 20 April 1991, after losing 2–1 at Manchester City. The final relegation place went to Sunderland on the last day of the season when they lost 3–2 to Manchester City, while Luton Town stayed up by beating already-relegated Derby County 2–0. 

Sheffield United started the season disastrously, with four points from their opening sixteen matches, before getting their first win, 3–2 at home to Nottingham Forest just before Christmas. An impressive run of 13 wins from their final 22 games, including seven in a row, saw them finish well clear of the relegation zone in 13th.

Aston Villa, the previous season's runners-up, lost manager Graham Taylor when he accepted the Football Association's offer to take over as manager of the England team. Villa turned to Czech coach Jozef Venglos, the first foreign manager in the First Division, but their league form slumped and they finished 17th.

Still only 31, former England defender Terry Butcher became the youngest manager in the Football League in November when he accepted Coventry City's offer to become player-manager following the sacking of John Sillett.

Managerial changes

League standings

Results

Top scorers

Hat-tricks

Note: (H) – Home; (A) – Away

References

RSSSF

 
Football League First Division seasons
Eng
1990–91 Football League
1990–91 in English football leagues